Saint-Gaudens, Saint Gaudens, and St. Gaudens may refer to:

Places
 Arrondissement of Saint-Gaudens, an arrondissement (district) of France
 Saint-Gaudens, Haute-Garonne, a commune in the Haute-Garonne department in southwestern France
 Saint-Gaudens National Historic Site, the home, gardens, and studios of Augustus Saint-Gaudens in Cornish, New Hampshire

People
 Augustus Saint-Gaudens (1848-1907), an Irish-born American sculptor
 Louis St. Gaudens (1854-1913), an American sculptor and brother of Augustus 
 Homer Saint-Gaudens (1880-1958), American academic and son of Augustus

Other uses
 Open Saint-Gaudens Occitanie, a tennis tournament in Saint-Gaudens, Haute-Garonne
 Saint-Gaudens Bears, a French rugby league team
 St. Gaudens Double Eagle, a twenty dollar gold coin designed by Augustus Saint-Gaudens